The Ireland men's national squash team represents Ireland in international squash team competitions, and is governed by Irish Squash Federation.

Since 1979, Ireland has participated in four round of 16 of the World Squash Team Open.

Current team
 Arthur Gaskin
 Sean Conroy
 Brian O'Brion
 Michael Craig
 Steve Richardson

Results

World Team Squash Championships

European Squash Team Championships

See also
 Irish Squash Federation
 World Team Squash Championships
 Ireland women's national squash team

References

Squash
Squash teams
Men's national squash teams
Squash in Ireland